Nadine Bismuth (born July 15, 1975) is a Canadian writer from Montreal, Quebec. She is most noted for her short story collection Êtes-vous mariée à un psychopathe?, which was a shortlisted finalist for the Governor General's Award for French-language fiction at the 2009 Governor General's Awards, and her novel Un lien familial, which won the 2020 edition of Le Combat des livres.

The novel was defended in Le Combat des livres by singer France D'Amour.

She is a graduate of McGill University.

Works

Novels
 Scrapbook, 2004
English translation by Susan Ouriou, 2009
 Un lien familial, 2018
English translation A Family Affair by Russell Smith, 2020

Short story collections 
 Les gens fidèles ne font pas les nouvelles, 1999
English translation Fidelity Doesn't Make the News by Susan Ouriou, 2008
 Sédentaires, 2004
 Êtes-vous mariée à un psychopathe ?, 2009
 English translation Are You Married to a Psychopath by Donald Winkler, 2010

References

1975 births
21st-century Canadian novelists
21st-century Canadian short story writers
21st-century Canadian women writers
Canadian women short story writers
Canadian women novelists
Canadian novelists in French
Canadian short story writers in French
Canadian people of Tunisian descent
French Quebecers
McGill University alumni
Writers from Montreal
Living people